Roundup is a city in and the county seat of Musselshell County, Montana, United States. The population was 1,742 during the 2020 census.

History
Roundup served as a place for cattlemen to "round up" their cattle along the Musselshell River. It was the trailhead in the Great Montana Centennial Cattle Drive and now drives happen annually.

The post office opened in 1883. In 1907, the Milwaukee Road reached Roundup.

The area has coal mines, which combined with the agriculture, maintained the economy of the town.  The Musselshell Valley Historical Museum captures the coal history as well as fossils and Indian artifacts.

From Hell to Breakfast in Old Montana, by Leland Blanchard, tells the story of pioneers who lived and worked in Roundup in the early 1900s.

Roundup is a hub in Amazon.com's supply chain with a growing industry of prep centers, or businesses that specialize in packing goods to meet the requirements of Amazon's highly automated warehouses.

Geography and climate
Roundup is located at  (46.448401, -108.542676).

The Musselshell River runs through the city. Roundup is bordered to the south by the Bull Mountains which rise from the great plains over a hundred miles east of the front range of the Rocky Mountains.

According to the Köppen Climate Classification system, Roundup has a cold semi-arid climate, abbreviated "BSk" on climate maps.

Demographics

2010 census
As of the census of 2010, there were 1,788 people, 814 households, and 445 families residing in the city. The racial makeup of the city was 95.7% White, 0.3% African American, 1.3% Native American, 0.1% Asian, 0.2% from other races, and 2.4% from two or more races. Hispanic or Latino people of any race were 4.1% of the population.

There were 814 households, of which 26.3% had children under the age of 18 living with them, 41.5% were married couples living together, 8.6% had a female householder with no husband present, 4.5% had a male householder with no wife present, and 45.3% were non-families. 40.5% of all households were made up of individuals, and 18.2% had someone living alone who was 65 years of age or older. The average household size was 2.17 and the average family size was 2.94.

The median age in the city was 43.6 years. 23.7% of residents were under the age of 18; 6.5% were between the ages of 18 and 24; 21.2% were from 25 to 44; 31.6% were from 45 to 64; and 16.8% were 65 years of age or older. The gender makeup of the city was 48.0% male and 52.0% female.

2000 census
As of the census of 2000, there were 1,931 people, 833 households, and 498 families residing in the city. The population density was 1,437.8 people per square mile (556.4/km). There were 978 housing units at an average density of 728.2 per square mile (281.8/km). The racial makeup of the city was 97.05% White, 0.16% African American, 0.78% Native American, 0.10% Asian, 0.47% from other races, and 1.45% from two or more races. Hispanic or Latino people of any race were 2.74% of the population.

There were 833 households, out of which 29.2% had children under the age of 18 living with them, 47.9% were married couples living together, 8.9% had a female householder with no husband present, and 40.1% were non-families. 36.7% of all households were made up of individuals, and 19.7% had someone living alone who was 65 years of age or older. The average household size was 2.25 and the average family size was 2.96.

In the city, the population was spread out, with 25.0% under the age of 18, 6.2% from 18 to 24, 24.3% from 25 to 44, 22.6% from 45 to 64, and 21.9% who were 65 years of age or older. The median age was 42 years. For every 100 females there were 87.3 males. For every 100 females age 18 and over, there were 85.6 males.

The median income for a household in the city was $23,144, and the median income for a family was $31,129. Males had a median income of $25,875 versus $17,011 for females. The per capita income for the city was $15,123. About 13.7% of families and 20.3% of the population were below the poverty line, including 27.4% of those under age 18 and 14.7% of those age 65 or over.

Infrastructure
Roundup Airport is a public use airport located two miles (4 km) north of town.

Education
Roundup School District educates students from kindergarten through 12th grade. Roundup High School's team name is the Panthers.

Roundup School-Community Library is a public library which serves the area.

Notable people
Earl W. Bascom, rodeo pioneer, hall of fame inductee, "father of modern rodeo", cowboy artist and cousin to Charles M. Russell, worked on roundup on the Seven Crowfoot Ranch
Richard Cebull, Chief Judge, United States District Court for the District of Montana, born and raised in Roundup
Bill Holm, art historian, born in Roundup
John Milkovich, member of the Louisiana State Senate; lawyer in Shreveport, Louisiana; reared in Roundup
Lee Steen, outsider artist, lived most of his life and worked in Roundup

References

External links

 
 City of Roundup

Cities in Musselshell County, Montana
County seats in Montana
Cities in Montana